is a third-person shooter video game developed and published by Capcom and Beeline Interactive, Inc. The game is the sequel to Lost Planet: Extreme Condition, taking place ten years after the events of the first game, on the same planet. The game was developed for BlackBerry, PlayStation 3, Xbox 360 and Microsoft Windows. Originally set to be released in early 2010, Capcom delayed the game's consoles release to May 11, 2010 in North America and Europe, May 13 in Australia and May 20 for Japan, while the BlackBerry version was released worldwide on April 28 and the Microsoft Windows version was released in October that year. The title sold more than 1.5 million copies worldwide.

On November 9, 2021, the Steam version of Lost Planet 2 was pulled from sale due to some underlying issues with the game's Games for Windows – Live features. The publisher of the game Capcom has stated that is "investigating the matter further".

Gameplay

Many gameplay features from the original Lost Planet game are present. Recurring elements include major boss battles, extreme terrain, and the ability to pilot mechanized armor suits, known as Vital Suits (VSs). On July 24, 2009, at Comic-Con 2009, producer Jun Takeuchi held a Q&A session for fans. Takeuchi revealed that there would be a lot more co-op based VSs. Players will be able to ride on the sides of some VSs. These VSs can be controlled by one player, while two others hang on by the sides and shoot. Takeuchi also revealed that there would be flying VSs which feature unlimited flying time.

Also unlike Lost Planet, Lost Planet 2 will not constantly drain players of thermal energy. This is due to the warmer climate, which can sustain T-ENG presence longer than a cold climate, which drains thermal energy over time. Instead, energy can only be drained when the player pilots a VS and uses a weapon that requires energy. However, thermal energy is still constantly lost unless a specific ability is equipped despite the 'warmer climate'. The character may also lose thermal energy by completing one entire sprint with a character (confirmed in the demo). If one player loses all of their energy, another can give them some of their energy, using a new weapon, to keep players alive.

Kenji Oguro and Jun Takeuchi announced that the game would reward players with experience points. Players will earn more points for playing in a unique manner and completing extra objectives in missions. Once the game has been beaten on any difficulty, players are allowed to use this character for the campaign. These points can then be used to unlock costumes and attachments for the player to customize their Pirate.

Online versus
Lost Planet 2 borrowed the online multiplayer versus modes of its predecessor, and featured new modes as well. Versus characters can also be modified in far greater depth than in the original game, customising not only skins but a wide selection of skins for legs, the face and torso.

Plot
One decade on from the events of the first game, the climate of E.D.N. III has undergone drastic changes that have produced radically different biomes across the planet. These new circumstances have not stalled the ongoing conflict between various human factions to gain control of the planet's supply of Thermal Energy (T-ENG), whilst the indigenous Akrid creatures have begun to metamorphosise into new, unexpected forms. The most dangerous of these are colossal Akrid, classified as "Category G", that contain immense amounts of T-ENG and can alter the landscape of the environment by virtue of simply existing.

The story is divided into instalments called episodes. Episodes shift focus between the various factions – each with their own objectives, technology, and methods – as they take steps to ensure their continued survival and vie for supremacy. In addition to the Snow Pirates from the first game, playable factions featured in Lost Planet 2 include New NEVEC (a colonial military force), Ex-NEVEC (defectors from the former), Waysiders (mountain-based survivalists) and Vagabundos (roving packs of desert bandits). Other factions, such as the industrious Carpetbaggers, are also encountered and fought.

Events seen throughout the game begin to steadily intertwine and culminate in an urgent cross-faction alliance to prevent the forces of New NEVEC from exploiting the maturation cycle of the "Over-G" – a lifeform so large and powerful as to surpass even the Category G Akrid – to annihilate every living thing on planet E.D.N. III.

Development
Lost Planet 2 runs on the MT Framework 2.0, an updated version of the engine used in the original Lost Planet. A support for the campaign mode can have up to four players working together via the internet.

Unlike its predecessor, Lost Planet 2 allows players to create and customize their own characters and allows them to unlock more clothing and body types after leveling up and downloading content. The game also allows players to edit weapon models, and color palettes used. However, weapons used in multi-player have to be unlocked through leveling up. Players can take content that they have unlocked in the campaign and take that onto multiplayer versus (and vice versa). In February 2010 the Xbox 360 version of the game was rumored to have significant cuts in order to make the game fit on a single DVD and the content cut to be available as downloadable content but no confirmation has been given if this content was to be charged for or free. These claims were later to be deemed as a mistranslation. In an interview with the game's producer, he claimed that there was no content cut from the Xbox 360 version.

Marketing and promotion

Lost Planet 2 was announced on February 8, 2009, via a trailer on Xbox Live. In mid-April 2009, a video was released by Eurogamer with a boss battle being depicted in real-time gameplay. The video showed thermal energy usage, VSs, and deployable health fields. At E3 2009, Capcom offered a preview of Lost Planet 2s co-op campaign, and announced a Winter 2009 release date. On June 29, 2009, at Microsoft's Midnight Live 360 show, Capcom announced a Lost Planet 2 demo that is available via Xbox Live Marketplace.

On July 19, 2009, Capcom announced that Lost Planet 2 would be playable at Comic-Con 2009. The Capcom Unity Blog reported that visitors would be able to try the four-player campaign mission against the giant salamander boss. At the event, Capcom also held a raffle to give away a number of 16-inch plush toys and a single 3-foot-long plush toy of the salamander boss.

On August 19, 2009, a four-player co-op demo of Lost Planet 2 was released onto Xbox Live Marketplace. On September 24, 2009, a demo was released through PlayStation Network PlayStation Store, which features two new levels. This demo also features full game launching support for up to four players for PlayStation Home, the PlayStation 3's online community-based service. Game launching lets users set up multiplayer games in Home and launch directly into the game from Home.

On December 22, it was announced that Capcom would delay Lost Planet 2, along with three other games, to avoid competition in the early half of 2010.

On January 26, Capcom announced during an announcement for Monster Hunter Frontier for the Xbox 360 that Lost Planet 2 would be released on May 18 in North America and Europe and May 20 in Japan. Also announced was the addition of two characters, Marcus Fenix and Dominic Santiago from the Gears of War series for the Xbox 360. Capcom also confirmed that Albert Wesker from Resident Evil would be in the game.

A character model from the Monster Hunter franchise was announced by Joystiq to be PlayStation 3 exclusive. Frank West from Dead Rising is also featured in the game.

To create a buzz around the launch of Lost Planet 2, Capcom conducted an experiential marketing campaign at The Arches in London Bridge, two months ahead of its UK launch. People were invited to be the first to play Lost Planet 2, in a venue dressed with sand bags, military paraphernalia and oil drums to reflect the atmosphere of the game.

On March 26, Capcom announced that a new multiplayer demo for Lost Planet 2 would be coming to Xbox Live and the PlayStation Network. Early access would be distributed via voucher codes within the company's community, while public access would be made available on April 21 for Xbox Live and April 22 for PSN.

In addition, if the Lost Planet 2 multiplayer demo reached one million downloads by midnight Pacific Time on May 5, Capcom would donate $50,000 to Music for Relief, a charity founded by Linkin Park members to provide aid to victims of natural disasters. Plus, members of the Lost Planet community had the opportunity to win a seat in a celebrity tournament to be held at the game's May 6 pre-release party in Los Angeles.

On May 14, PlayStation Blog announced that PlayStation 3 owners would also be able to download two skins of the Helghast characters from the Killzone franchise, in addition to the Rathalos armor from Monster Hunter.

A benchmark for the Windows PC version was released on August 16, 2010, and Capcom announced that the PC version would include several DirectX 11 effects and support for the Nvidia 3D Vision and Nvidia 3D Vision Surround setups to deliver a stereoscopic image. In an interview Jun Takeuchi, the title's producer, stated that the PC version features higher resolution textures and several DirectX 11 effects such as subdivision surface, displacement mapping, softbody, interactive fluid surfaces and high-quality shadow filtering.

Downloadable content
In June, there was a release of downloadable content for Lost Planet 2 for the PlayStation 3. Two Helghast costumes are available to use in multiplayer and single-player modes. The DLC is completely free of charge. There is also a map pack that was released pre-game release (noted from Xbox Marketplace and PlayStation Network). A map pack was released on June 1, 2010 for the PlayStation 3 and June 2, 2010 for the Xbox Marketplace. Map Pack 2 has two more maps for multiplayer. The first is called Dockyard Battle and takes place in the overland battleship from Episode 5 of the campaign. The second, Frozen Wasteland, is a remake of a map from Lost Planet: Extreme Condition. A third added a "Boss Rush" mode and the "Post Modern" skin.

Reception

Lost Planet 2 received "mixed or average reviews" on all platforms according to the review aggregation website Metacritic.

GamePro said of the Xbox 360 version that "Lost Planet 2 features an enjoyable multiplayer component and interesting monster designs, but it isn't enough to overcome its many faults. Gamers who enjoyed playing the original title online will find reasons to play it, but it's a disappointing title that doesn't live up to its potential". GameSpot took a similar view on the frustrations of the PlayStation 3 and Xbox 360 versions, stating: "This sci-fi sequel seems like it should have everything you need in a shooter, but a shocking number of design missteps suck out much of the fun". They later released a second review for the PC release. The review explains the differences and tweaks made to make the game more tolerable and much more graphically advanced than the console installment. IGN said of the PC version: "If you've burned through other multiplayer or co-op options, then there might be something for you in Lost Planet 2. The single-player campaign is lengthy at around 14 hours with full co-op support and the multiplayer has plenty of maps and modes. Just do yourself a favor: buy some insurance for the controller you'll invariably throw across the room at one of Lost Planet 2'''s seemingly endless design and interface issues". In Japan, Famitsu gave the PS3 and Xbox 360 versions each a score of two eights, one nine, and one eight for a total of 33 out of 40.The Daily Telegraph gave the Xbox 360 version a score of eight out of ten and said, "following on from co-op leviathans like Left 4 Dead and Gears of War, Lost Planet 2 is certainly standing on the shoulders of giants. It's not quite pumping lead into their glowing orange weak spots, but it's not far off the mark". The Escapist gave it three out of five and said, "the guns and bugs make for some spectacular fireworks, but, after the sparks settle, you are left wishing you had played something a little more substantial". Edge similarly gave it a score of six out of ten and said, "at its best it's an engaging spectacle, but when it falters Lost Planet 2 is a gamble that doesn't pay off". 411Mania gave the PS3 and Xbox 360 versions a score of 5.5 out of 10 and called it "a disappointing sequel that is inferior to the original. The controls are poor and confusing, the story is not interesting, and the artificial intelligence is far from intelligent. Outside of the beautiful landscape that you will explore, there’s little to enjoy as you battle the Akrid for T-ENG. The only redeeming quality this game has is the multiplayer experience, but there are far better options out there and you’ll quickly grow tired of it too, even with all of the customization available". The A.V. Club'' gave the Xbox 360 version a D− and said it was just "another deposit of digital cholesterol on a constricting artery that's one cheeseburger away from being clogged forever by uninspired third-person shooters".

References

External links

2010 video games
BlackBerry games
Capcom games
Games for Windows certified games
Video games about mecha
PlayStation 3 games
Science fiction video games
Third-person shooters
Video game sequels
Video games developed in Japan
Video games set on fictional planets
Windows games
Xbox 360 games
Multiplayer and single-player video games